Zoli Ádok, pseudonym of Zoltán Ádok (born Szeged, Hungary, 22 March 1976) is a Hungarian pop/musical singer, actor and dancer who represented his nation at the 2009 Eurovision Song Contest with the song "Dance With Me".

Biography

Early life
Zoli Ádok was born on 22 March 1976 in Szeged, Hungary. He is the second child in his family. He has one sister.

Career
Zoli's career began from 1996 when after finishing his dance studies in Pécs, he started his career with Ivan Marko in the Hungarian Festival Ballett then joined the Le Dance Contemporary Dance Company led by award-winning Andrea Ladányi. He moved on to travel around the world as a dancer and musical actor in Switzerland in the musical Fame.

Cats (Berlin) 2002–2004

In 2008 Zoli released his debut album, which is called "Tánclépés".

In 2009 Zoli represented his nation at the 2009 Eurovision Song Contest with the song "Dance With Me". Zoli's song was the internal selection jury's third choice, but after the original winning song was disqualified and the first runner-up withdrawn, Zoli's song was chosen for Moscow. He competed in the second semi-final but failed to reach the final. He did however, win the Barbara Dex Award.

Zoli released his second album in 2011, entitled "Három álom".

Zoli Adok has left Hungary and started performing on various luxury cruise lines:

 2012–2013 Crystal Cruises
 2013–2015 Celebrity Cruises as a lead vocalist on the Celebrity Eclipse and Celebrity Solstice

Since 2016 he has been a lead vocalist on Princess Cruises. Grand Princess, Golden Princess and the Star Princess ( first ever Hungarian lead singer in 52 years in Princess Cruise's history ) where he just recently opened a new show called Born to dance, working with Daniel C. Leine (director) and Steven Schwartz (Wicked, Gospel, Pipin) who produced the show.

Discography

Albums

Singles

References

1976 births
Living people
Hungarian pop singers
Eurovision Song Contest entrants for Hungary
Eurovision Song Contest entrants of 2009
People from Szeged
21st-century Hungarian male singers